Neognathodus is an extinct genus of conodonts.

Use in stratigraphy 
The Bashkirian, the oldest age of the Pennsylvanian (also known as Upper Carboniferous), contains six biozones based on conodont index fossils, two of which contain Neognathodus species:
 the zone of Neognathodus atokaensis
 the zone of Neognathodus askynensis

The base of the Moscovian, the second stage in the Pennsylvanian, can biostratigraphically be divided into five conodont biozones, three of which contain Neognathodus species:
 the zone of Neognathodus roundyi and Streptognathodus cancellosus
 the zone of Neognathodus medexultimus and Streptognathodus concinnus
 the zone of Neognathodus uralicus

References 

  Taxonomy, Phylogeny, and Biostratigraphy of Neognathodus in Appalachian Pennsylvanian Rocks. Glen K. Merrill, Journal of Paleontology, Vol. 46, No. 6 (Nov., 1972), pages 817-829 (Stable URL)
 Apparatus of the Pennsylvanian Conodont genus Neognathodus. Glen K Merrill and Peter H Von Bitter, Royal Ontario Museum, 1977, pages 11–13
 Neognathodus and the species concept in conodont paleontology. Glen K Merrill, Bollettino della Societa Paleontologica Italiana, January 1998, volume 37, issue 2, pages 465-473

External links 
 
 

Conodont genera
Pennsylvanian conodonts
Bashkirian life
Moscovian life
Pennsylvanian first appearances
Pennsylvanian extinctions
Fossil taxa described in 1968